The Hanriot H.35 was a 1920s French intermediate training monoplane designed and built by Avions Hanriot.

Design and development

The H.35 was developed from the earlier H.34 basic trainer and was a two-seat strut-braced parasol  monoplane. The H.35 was powered by a  Hispano-Suiza 8Ab piston engine. Twelve aircraft were built for use with the Hanriot flying school and also the Societe Francaise d'Aviation at Orly. 
 
A 1925 development of the H.35 was the H.36 which was a twin-float equipped version powered by a  Salmson 9Ac piston engine. An order for 50 H.36s was placed by Yugoslavia.

Specifications (H.35)

References

Notes

Bibliography

1920s French civil trainer aircraft
H.35
Single-engined tractor aircraft
Parasol-wing aircraft